de Swardt is a surname. Notable people with the surname include:

Abraham de Swardt (born 1963), South African cricketer
Albé de Swardt (born 1990), South African rugby player
Cobus de Swardt, South African sociologist
Mariaan de Swardt (born 1971), South African tennis player
Ruan de Swardt (born 1998), South African cricketer